HMS Arethusa was the name ship of her class of eight light cruisers built for the Royal Navy in the 1910s. She saw a considerable amount of action during the early years of the First World War, participating in the Battle of Heligoland Bight and the Battle of Dogger Bank.

Design and description
The Arethusa-class cruisers were intended to lead destroyer flotillas and defend the fleet against attacks by enemy destroyers.

The main armament of the Arethusa-class ships consisted of two BL  Mk XII guns that were mounted on the centreline fore and aft of the superstructure and six QF  Mk V guns in waist mountings. They were also fitted with a single QF 3-pounder  anti-aircraft gun and four  torpedo tubes in two twin mounts.

Construction and career

She was laid down at Chatham Dockyard in October 1912, launched on 25 October 1913, and commissioned in August 1914 as flotilla leader for the Harwich Force. On 28 August 1914, she fought at the Battle of Heligoland Bight, flying the flag of Commodore Reginald Tyrwhitt. On 25 December, Arethusa took part in the Cuxhaven Raid and on 24 January 1915 she fought at the Battle of Dogger Bank. Later in the same year, she was transferred to the 5th Light Cruiser Squadron of the Harwich Force. In September 1915, she captured four German trawlers. On 11 February 1916, she struck a mine off Felixstowe, drifted onto a shoal while under tow, and broke her back. Approximately near Harwich (51.925, 1.295)

Legacy 

One of the four relief panels on Brierley Hill War Memorial, in Dudley, England, depicts Arethusa sending out its boats to rescue German sailors from a ship it had sunk.

Notes

Bibliography

External links

 

Arethusa-class cruisers (1913)
1913 ships
World War I cruisers of the United Kingdom
Ships sunk by mines
World War I shipwrecks in the North Sea
Ships built in Chatham